Théophile Voirol September 3, 1781, Tavannes, Canton of Bern – September 15, 1853) was a Swiss general in the French Republican Army, who later became a French nobleman and Governor of Algeria.

He was born into a rich family in Tavannes in the Jura region of the Canton of Bern, the son of a pastor. At 12, he was sent to Basel to enter an apprenticeship as a merchant, but he disliked that occupation.

When the French Revolution erupted in 1789, the French Republic sent its army into the territory of the Bishop of Basel in 1792. The country was annexed to France, and many young men were conscripted to fill the ranks, among them Théophile's older brother. His family was in despair, but 18-year-old Théophile quickly offered himself as a substitute. This was the beginning of a long and brilliant career in the French Army, serving under all the subsequent regimes, including the Consulate, the Napoleonic Empire, the Restoration, and the July Monarchy.

He retired to Besançon in 1848, where he died.

1781 births
1853 deaths
People from the Bernese Jura
French generals